Patrimonialism is a form of governance in which all power flows directly from the ruler. There is no distinction between the public and private domains. These regimes are autocratic or oligarchic and exclude the lower, middle and upper classes from power. The leaders of these countries typically enjoy absolute personal power. Usually, the armies of these countries are loyal to the leader, not the nation.

Various definitions

Max Weber 

Julia Adams, states: "In Weber's Economy and Society, patrimonialism mainly refers to forms of government that are based on rulers' family-households. The ruler's authority is personal-familial, and the mechanics of the household are the model for political administration. The concept of patrimonialism captures a distinctive style of regulation and administration that contrasts with Weber's ideal-typical rational-legal bureaucracy". She states that Weber has used patrimonialism to describe, among other systems, "estatist and absolutist politics of early modern Europe". For Weber, patriarchy is at the centre of patrimonalism and is its model and origin.

Nathan Quimpo 
Nathan Quimpo defines patrimonialism as "a type of rule in which the ruler does not distinguish between personal and public patrimony and treats matters and resources of state as his personal affair."

Richard Pipes
Richard Pipes, a historian and Professor Emeritus of Russian history at Harvard University defines patrimonial as "a regime where the rights of sovereignty and those of ownership blend to the point of being indistinguishable, and political power is exercised in the same manner as economic power."

J. I. Bakker
J. I. Bakker, a sociologist at the University of Guelph, states:

Francis Fukuyama
In his The Origins of Political Order, Francis Fukuyama describes it as political recruitment based on the two principles of kin selection and reciprocal altruism.

Examples
Richard Pipes cited the Egyptian Ptolemies and the Attalids of Pergamon as early patrimonial monarchies, both successor states to Alexander the Great's empire.

Pipes argues that the Russian Empire between the twelfth and seventeenth century, and with certain modifications until 1917, was a patrimonial system.

Jean Bodin described seigneurial monarchies in the Six Books of the Commonwealth (1576–1586), where the monarch owns all the land. He claimed that Turkey and Muscovy were the only European examples.

Indonesia, before and during the Suharto administration, is often cited as being patrimonial in its political-economy.

See also
 Crony capitalism
 Neo-patrimonialism
 Tsarist autocracy
 Pater familias

References

Political science terminology
Forms of government